At the 1912 Summer Olympics in Stockholm, 18 events in shooting were contested.

Medal summary

Participating nations
A total of 284 sport shooters from 16 nations competed at the Stockholm Games:

Medal table

References

External links
 

 
1912 Summer Olympics events
1912
Olympics
Shooting competitions in Sweden